Diego Rivas (born November 11, 1991) is a Chilean professional boxer and mixed martial artist. As a mixed martial artist, he competed in the bantamweight and featherweight divisions of the Ultimate Fighting Championship (UFC). He currently competes in boxing in the welterweight division.

Mixed martial arts career

Early career
Before joining the UFC, Rivas amassed a record of 5-0 with all but one of his wins coming by stoppages.

The Ultimate Fighter: Latin America
Rivas was a part of the 1st season of The Ultimate Fighter: Latin America. He was a part of team Latin America who were coached by Fabrício Werdum. He was eliminated in the quarter finals by Gabriel Benítez by rear-naked choke.

Ultimate Fighting Championship
Rivas made his promotional debut against Rodolfo Rubio on November 8, 2014 at UFC Fight Night 56. He won the fight via unanimous decision.

Rivas was briefly linked to a bout with Makwan Amirkhani on June 20, 2015 at UFC Fight Night 69. However, shortly after the bout was announced, Rivas was pulled from the fight due to undisclosed reasons and replaced by Masio Fullen.

Rivas next faced Noad Lahat on February 6, 2016 at UFC Fight Night 82.  He won the fight via knockout in the second round and earned a Performance of the Night bonus.

Rivas faced José Alberto Quiñónez on August 5, 2017 at UFC Fight Night 114. He lost the fight by unanimous decision.

Rivas faced Guido Cannetti on May 19, 2018 at UFC Fight Night 129. He lost the fight by unanimous decision.

On August 14, 2018, it was announced that Rivas was released from UFC.

In 2019, Rivas decided that he wouldn’t continue his MMA career, as he would focus on a boxing career instead.

Personal life
After the Noad Lahat fight in early 2016, Rivas was diagnosed with testicular cancer which was successfully treated.

Mixed martial arts record

|-
|Loss
|align=center|7–2
|Guido Cannetti
|Decision (unanimous)
|UFC Fight Night: Maia vs. Usman
|
|align=center|3
|align=center|5:00
|Santiago, Chile
|
|-
|Loss
|align=center|7–1
|José Alberto Quiñónez
|Decision (unanimous)
|UFC Fight Night: Pettis vs. Moreno
|
|align=center|3
|align=center|5:00
|Mexico City, Mexico
|
|-
|Win
|align=center| 7–0
|Noad Lahat
|KO (flying knee)
| UFC Fight Night: Hendricks vs. Thompson
|
|align=center|2
|align=center|0:23
|Las Vegas, Nevada, United States
|
|-
|Win
|align=center|6–0
|Rodolfo Rubio
|Decision (unanimous)
|UFC Fight Night: Shogun vs. Saint Preux
|
|align=center|3
|align=center|5:00
|Uberlândia, Brazil
|
|-
|Win
|align=center|5–0
|Gaston Gomez Manzur
|Decision (unanimous)
|Masters Fighters Championship 10
|
|align=center|3
|align=center|5:00
|Valparaíso, Chile
|
|-
|Win
|align=center|4–0
|Patricio Lagos
|TKO (doctor stoppage)
|rowspan=2|Masters Fighters Championship
|rowspan=2|
|align=center|2
|align=center|5:00
|rowspan=2|Santiago, Chile
|
|-
|Win
|align=center|3–0
|Rodolfo Guzman
|Submission (rear-naked choke)
|align=center|1
|align=center|2:52
|
|-
|Win
|align=center|2–0
|Pablo Reyes
|Submission (punches)
|Extreme Kumite Evolution 3
|
|align=center|1
|align=center|2:01
|Temuco, Chile
|
|-
|Win
|align=center|1–0
|Jaime Barriga
|Submission (guillotine choke)
|Extreme Kumite Evolution 2
|
|align=center|1
|align=center|1:35
|Temuco, Chile
|

Professional boxing record

See also
List of current UFC fighters
List of male mixed martial artists

References

External links
 
 

1991 births
Living people
Featherweight mixed martial artists
Mixed martial artists utilizing Brazilian jiu-jitsu
Chilean male mixed martial artists
Chilean practitioners of Brazilian jiu-jitsu
Ultimate Fighting Championship male fighters
Chilean male boxers
People from Temuco